R. Durtnell & Sons was an English building company established in 1591 that had been continuously in the same family in Brasted, in the English county of Kent, until 2019 when the firm went out of business. The first building it constructed, Poundsbridge Manor (also called The Picture House), was completed in 1593, and it was the same firm that restored the house following bomb damage in the Second World War.

Durtnell family business
Starting in 1591, the firm that became R. Durtnell & Sons Limited had been handed down from father to son as a private company for thirteen generations. It was claimed to be the oldest building firm in Britain. According to Dun & Bradstreet, the business information provider, at the time it ceased trading it was "the third oldest company in the UK still in operation" – there were only two older companies in any sector in Britain with a continuous existence: Oxford University Press and Cambridge University Press. However, conflicting claims have also been made.

From about 1570 John Durtnall had been a "carpenter" (the name for a builder at that time) and master carpenter making timber-frame Wealden houses. He teamed up with his brother Brian to build a house for their father, William. The house, Poundsbridge Manor in Penshurst, Kent, was completed in 1593. Thus he became a housewright, employing carpenters and other craftsmen, purchasing the timber, stone, tiles and other building materials required. The seventh generation owner, Richard (1766 to 1845), is regarded as establishing the modern business. In the ninth generation the owner, also a Richard, set up a formal partnership with his two sons so giving the firm its present name. To mark their quatercentenary, Hugh Barty-King wrote a book about the history of the firm, A country builder: The story of Richard Durtnell & Sons of Brasted 1591–1991.

The business continued at its original location in Brasted, Kent, building luxury houses and doing specialist building, restoration and renovation of historic buildings over the south-east of England for customers such as local authorities, heritage organisations and churches. In 2014 the firm had a turnover of more than £50 million and more than 130 full-time staff.

In July 2019 the company ceased trading whilst working on a renovation project for the Brighton Corn Exchange.

In August 2019, creditors agreed to give the company more time to pay its debts under a debt repayment plan known as a company voluntary agreement (CVA).

Notes

References

External links
 2013 archive of company website

Companies established in the 16th century
Organizations established in the 1590s
1591 establishments in England
Companies based in Kent
Construction and civil engineering companies of England
Housebuilding companies of the United Kingdom
2019 disestablishments in England
Construction and civil engineering companies disestablished in 2019
British companies disestablished in 2019